Westenfeld is a village and a former municipality in the district of Hildburghausen, in Thuringia, Germany. Since 31 December 2012, it is part of the town Römhild.

History
The village was first mentioned in 871.  The site originally belonged to the Fulda monastery, and later was the possession of the Vessra Abbey. Westenfeld was sacked in 1634 and set on fire.
The village church was first mentioned in 1185, the current structure was built in 1579. The baptismal font is from the 16th Century, the first bell is from 1777 (J.A. Mayer, Coburg), the second from 1850 (R. Mayer, Rudolstadt).

Westenfeld has a Historical Museum.

See also

References

Former municipalities in Thuringia